The following is a list of notable deaths in August 1990.

Entries for each day are listed alphabetically by surname. A typical entry lists information in the following sequence:
 Name, age, country of citizenship at birth, subsequent country of citizenship (if applicable), reason for notability, cause of death (if known), and reference.

August 1990

1
Michel Arnaud, 74, French general, heart attack.
Roar Berthelsen, 55, Norwegian long jumper.
Carl Ekern, 36, American football player, traffic collision.
Norbert Elias, 93, German sociologist.
Michael Glenny, 62, British academic and translator, heart attack.
Lotta Hitschmanova, 80, Czech-Canadian humanitarian, cancer.
Robert Krieps, 67, Luxembourgish politician.
Bárbara Mujica, 46, Argentine actress, heart attack.
Tiger Joginder Singh, 71, Indian professional wrestler.
Graham Young, 42, English convicted serial killer, heart attack.

2
Fahad Al-Ahmed Al-Jaber Al-Sabah, 44, Kuwaiti royal and sports administrator, killed in battle.
Adonias Filho, 74, Brazilian writer.
Al Guokas, 64, American basketball player.
Norman Maclean, 87, American novelist.
François Perrier, 68, French psychoanalyst.
Edwin Richfield, 68, English actor.
Nikolaus Riehl, 89, German nuclear physicist.
Al Rosen, 80, American actor, cancer.

3
Betty Amann, 85, German-American film actress.
Nella Maria Bonora, 86, Italian actress.
Bob Brown, 79, American baseball player.
Thomas Dunne, 64, Irish politician.
M. Ranga Rao, 58, Indian composer, cancer.
Wilbur Schwartz, 72, American musician.
George Stavrinos, 42, Greek-American illustrator, complications of pneumonia.
Paul Watkins, 40, American cult member (Manson Family), leukemia.

4
Ian Allison, 81, Canadian basketball player.
As'ad Syamsul Arifin, 92-93, Indonesian ulama.
Mathias Goeritz, 75, German-Mexican artist.
Norman Malcolm, 79, American philosopher.
Ettore Maserati, 95-96, Italian automotive engineer (Maserati).
Wajahat Mirza, 82, Indian filmmaker.
Pierre Nguyễn Huy Mai, 77, Vietnamese Roman Catholic prelate, bishop of Ban Mê Thuột (1967–1990).
John T. Wilson, 76, American academic.

5
Ivan Blatný, 70, Czech-British poet.
Aldo Grimaldi, 47-48, Italian filmmaker, cancer.
Jacob J. Hecht, 66, American rabbi, writer and radio commentator, heart attack.
Ellis T. Johnson, 79, American multi-sport athlete and coach.
Kazimierz Kaszuba, 60, Polish football player.
Zhou Keqin, 53, Chinese writer.
George Quin, 76, Irish Anglican prelate.

6
Charles Arnt, 83, American actor, cancer.
Taylor G. Belcher, 70, American diplomat, cancer.
Gordon Bunshaft, 81, American architect.
George Dixon, 56, Canadian football player.
Luis Lucchetti, 87, Argentine Olympic fencer (1928).
Lemuel Cornick Shepherd, Jr., 94, American general, bone cancer.
Jacques Soustelle, 78, French politician.
Antoon van Schendel, 80, Dutch road bicycle racer.
Pat Wall, 57, English politician.

7
Diego Carpitella, 66, Italian professor of ethnomusicology.
Tamara Deutscher, 77, Polish-British writer.
Phiny Dick, 77, Dutch illustrator and children's writer.
Gebhard Müller, 90, German politician.
Chepudira Muthana Poonacha, 79, Indian politician.

8
Andrzej Dobrowolski, 68, Polish composer.
Wallace Douglas, 78, Canadian producer, director and actor.
Joseph H. Harper, 89, United States Army officer.
Gopal Singh, 72, Indian Governor and politician.
Urho Teräs, 75, Finnish football player.

9
Dorothy Appleby, 84, American actress.
William Bosworth Castle, 92, American physician.
Joe Mercer, 76, English football player.
Władysław Orlicz, 87, Polish mathematician.
Art Van Tone, 71, American gridiron football player.

10
Jacobo Arenas, 66, Colombian guerrilla leader, cancer.
Harold Boyd, 89, Australian football player.
Martha Dodd, 81, American writer.
Cookie Lavagetto, 77, American baseball player.
Helmut Lipfert, 74, German flying ace during World War II.
David Martin, 57, Australian politician, lung cancer.
Eugenia Ravasio, 82, Italian Roman Catholic nun.
Joško Vidošević, 55, Yugoslav football player.

11
Bonnie Baker, 73, American singer.
Gonzalo Gaviria, 43, Colombian drug lord, shot.
Asa S. Knowles, 81, American academic.
Charles Marquis Warren, 77, American filmmaker, ventricular aneurysm.

12
Paul Cuba, 82, American football player.
Ethyl Eichelberger, 45, American drag queen, suicide by exsanguination.
Christa Jungnickel, 55, German-American science historian.
B. Kliban, 55, American cartoonist, pulmonary embolism.
Dorothy Mackaill, 87, British-American actress, liver failure.
Piotr Perkowski, 89, Polish composer.
Sara Seegar, 76, American actress, cerebral hemorrhage.
James Stewart, 80, Canadian basketball player.
Fay Thomas, 86, American baseball player, suicide by gunshot.
Roy Williamson, 54, Scottish songwriter, brain cancer.

13
Caridad Bravo Adams, 82, Mexican screenwriter.
Dallas Bixler, 80, American Olympic gymnast (1932).
Hedley Donovan, 76, American magazine editor.
Inés Mendoza, 82, Puerto Rican writer, first lady (1949–1965).
Alejandro Otero, 69, Venezuelan painter and sculptor.
Jimmy Starr, 86, American screenwriter.
Henry Swoboda, 92, Czechoslovakian conductor.

14
Henry Crown, 94, American industrialist.
John Fox, 38, American writer, AIDS.
Lafayette Leake, 71, American jazz musician, diabetes.
Sun Lianzhong, 97, Taiwanese general.
Thomas Matthewman, 87, British Olympic sprinter (1924).
Liu Xingyuan, 81, Chinese politician and general.

15
Nina Bara, 70, American actress.
Jimmy Carruthers, 61, Australian boxer, lung cancer.
Lew DeWitt, 52, American musician, kidney failure.
Bob Garbark, 80, American baseball player.
Billy Hume, 54, Scottish football player.
Inger Koppernæs, 62, Norwegian politician.
Kalamandalam Krishnan Nair, 76, Indian dancer.
Viktor Tsoi, 28, Soviet singer, traffic collision.
Louis Vola, 88, French bassist.

16
Pierre Bonnet, 92, French arachnologist.
Bobby Gordon, 54, American football player.
Pat O'Connor, 65, New Zealand wrestler, cancer.
Ernest Pogosyants, 55, Soviet chess player.
Ricardo Saprissa, 89, Salvadoran-Costa Rican football player.

17
Pearl Bailey, 72, American actress (Hello, Dolly!) and singer ("Takes Two to Tango"), cardiovascular disease.
David A. Burchinal, 75, American general, cancer.
Roderick Cook, 58, English actor and playwright, heart attack.
Ian Handysides, 27, English footballer, brain cancer.
Gordon Parsons, 63, Australian country music singer-songwriter.
Maria Paudler, 87, German actress.
Larry Weldon, 75, American football player.
Graham Williams, 45, English television producer, shot.

18
Grethe Ingmann, 52, Danish singer, cancer.
József Kovács, 79, Hungarian hurdler.
D. Scott Rogo, 40, American writer, murdered.
Mary Shaw Shorb, 83, American biochemist.
B. F. Skinner, 86, American social philosopher, leukemia.

19
Olavi Alakulppi, 75, Finnish military officer and cross-country skier.
Ilham Aliyev, 29, Soviet Azerbaijani soldier, killed in battle.
Jim Cavanagh, 77, Australian politician.
Ercole Gallegati, 78, Italian wrestler.
Anna Rutgers van der Loeff, 80, Dutch writer of children's novels.
Stephen Edward Smith, 62, American political consultant, lung cancer.
Richard Strout, 92, American journalist, complications from a fall.

20
Tim Barrett, 61, English actor.
Bill Curry, 54, English football player.
Rudolf Gellesch, 76, German football player.
Maurice Gendron, 69, French cellist.
Ray Johnson, 75, American gridiron football player.
John La Nauze, 79, Australian historian.
Ike Sewell, 86, American businessman (Uno Pizzeria & Grill), leukemia.

21
Antonio Argilés, 58, Spanish footballer.
Larry Buhler, 73, American football player.
Bill Lasley, 88, American baseball player.
Bob Uhl, 76, American baseball player.

22
Luigi Dadaglio, 75, Italian Roman Catholic cardinal.
Patrick McAlinney, 76, Irish actor.
Edward W. Pattison, 58, American politician, member of the U.S. House of Representatives (1975–1979), liver cancer.
Boris Shcherbina, 70, Soviet politician.

23
Samuel J. Brown, 72, American fighter pilot during World War II.
Yutaka Kanai, 30, Japanese Olympic runner (1984), accident.
Karl Löwenstein-Wertheim-Rosenberg, 86, German noble, head of the house of Löwenstein-Wertheim (since 1952).
Parviz Natel-Khanlari, 76, Iranian politician.
David Rose, 80, American songwriter ("The Stripper"), heart attack.
Omero Tognon, 66, Italian football player.

24
Victor Civita, 83, Italian-Brazilian journalist and publisher.
Sergei Dovlatov, 48, Soviet writer, heart failure.
Francis Hastings, 16th Earl of Huntingdon, 89, British politician and artist.
Harold Masursky, 67, American geologist.
Nick Metz, 76, Canadian ice hockey player.
Mickey Witek, 74, American baseball player.

25
Talbert Abrams, 95, American photographer and aviator.
Willard Leon Beaulac, 91, American diplomat, Alzheimer's disease.
Morley Callaghan, 87, Canadian writer.
David Hampshire, 72, British racing driver.

26
Mehdi Akhavan-Sales, 61, Iranian poet.
Sir Peter Agnew, 1st Baronet, 90, British politician.
Mário Pinto de Andrade, 62, Angolan poet and politician.
Minoru Honda, 77, Japanese astronomer.
Roh Ogura, 74, Japanese composer.
Paul Potts, 79, British-Canadian poet.
Retta Scott, 74, American animator.
Tom Toner, 40, American football player, cancer.

27
Ed Balatti, 66, American football player.
Kathleen Fitzpatrick, 84, Australian historian.
Raymond St. Jacques, 60, American actor and filmmaker, lymphoma.
Ramón Piñeiro López, 75, Spanish writer and politician.
Armin Scheurer, 72, Swiss athlete and football coach.
Stevie Ray Vaughan, 35, American blues musician and guitarist, helicopter crash.

28
Sumitra Devi, 67, Indian actress.
Larry Jackson, 59, American baseball player, cancer.
Richard Lauffen, 83, German actor.
Edmund H. North, 79, American screenwriter.
Rosely Roth, 31, Brazilian LGBT activist, suicide.
Paul Rowe, 73, Canadian football player.
Victorio Spinetto, 79, Argentine footballer.
Eva Stiberg, 69, Swedish actress.
Willy Vandersteen, 77, Belgian cartoonist (Spike and Suzy).

29
Luigi Beccali, 82, Italian Olympic runner (1932).
Manly Palmer Hall, 89, Canadian philosopher.
Chin Fung Kee, 70, Malaysian civil engineer.
Solomon Mikhlin, 82, Soviet mathematician, stroke.
Sayyid Shahab al-DIn Mar'ashi Najafi, 93, Iraqi Marja'.
Juozas Vinča, 84, Lithuanian-American boxer and Olympian.

30
Lou Garland, 85, American baseball player.
Edmund G. Love, 78, American author, heart attack.
Ch'ien Mu, 95, Chinese-Taiwanese historian and philosopher.
Bernard D. H. Tellegen, 90, Dutch electrical engineer.

31
Bert Assirati, 82, English professional wrestler, bladder cancer.
Nathaniel Clifton, 67, American basketball player.
James H. Donovan, 66, American politician, colon cancer.
Henry From, 64, Danish footballer.
Frank Hindman Golay, 75, American economist.
Johnny Lindsay, 81, South African cricket player.
Jack C. Rowan, 79, American football coach.
Sergey Volkov, 41, Soviet figure skater and Olympian, stomach cancer.

References 

1990-08
 08